Harrison is a village in Sioux County, Nebraska, United States. The population was 239 at the 2020 census. It is the county seat of Sioux County.

History
Harrison was originally called Bowen, and under that name was platted in 1886, when the Fremont, Elkhorn, & Missouri Valley Railroad was extended to that point. It was renamed Harrison in 1887, in honor of Benjamin Harrison. Harrison was incorporated in 1889.

Geography
Harrison is located at  (42.687984, -103.882115), on the American Great Plains.

At , Harrison has the highest elevation of any town in Nebraska, prompting it to bill itself as "Nebraska's Top Town".

The area around Harrison largely consists of grass-covered plains. Grasses and other flora present include little bluestem, prairie sandreed, blue grama, and needle and thread grass.  Wildflowers in the area include lupin, spiderwort, western wallflower, and sunflowers.

Demographics

2010 census
As of the census of 2010, there were 251 people, 134 households, and 69 families residing in the village. The racial makeup of the village was 98.4% White and 1.6% from two or more races. Hispanic or Latino of any race were 1.6% of the population.

There were 134 households, of which 20.1% had children under the age of 18 living with them, 41.8% were married couples living together, 6.7% had a female householder with no husband present, 3.0% had a male householder with no wife present, and 48.5% were non-families. 47.0% of all households were made up of individuals, and 23.9% had someone living alone who was 65 years of age or older. The average household size was 1.87 and the average family size was 2.67.

The median age in the village was 50.7 years. 19.5% of residents were under the age of 18; 4.9% were between the ages of 18 and 24; 20.4% were from 25 to 44; 27.2% were from 45 to 64; and 28.3% were 65 years of age or older. The gender makeup of the village was 46.6% male and 53.4% female.

2000 census
As of the census of 2000, there were 279 people, 137 households, and 80 families residing in the village. The population density was 905.5 people per square mile (347.5/km). There were 179 housing units at an average density of 580.9 per square mile (222.9/km). The racial makeup of the village was 98.92% White, 0.36% from other races, and 0.72% from two or more races. Hispanic or Latino of any race were 0.72% of the population.

There were 137 households, out of which 16.1% had children under the age of 18 living with them, 44.5% were married couples living together, 12.4% had a female householder with no husband present, and 41.6% were non-families. 40.9% of all households were made up of individuals, and 24.1% had someone living alone who was 65 years of age or older. The average household size was 2.04 and the average family size was 2.68.

In the village, the population was spread out, with 17.9% under the age of 18, 8.6% from 18 to 24, 17.9% from 25 to 44, 27.6% from 45 to 64, and 28.0% who were 65 years of age or older. The median age was 48 years. For every 100 females, there were 93.8 males. For every 100 females age 18 and over, there were 80.3 males.

As of 2000 the median income for a household in the village was $29,375, and the median income for a family was $29,688. Males had a median income of $25,500 versus $21,250 for females. The per capita income for the village was $15,071. About 11.8% of families and 18.6% of the population were below the poverty line, including 33.8% of those under the age of eighteen and 10.8% of those 65 or over.

Climate
Harrison has a humid continental climate (Köppen Dfb), with high diurnal temperature variation year round as a result of its high elevation and far inland location.

Area attractions

Agate Fossil Beds National Monument, maintained by the National Park Service is 25 minutes south of Harrison on River Road, Nebraska State Route 29.  The site is best known for the large number of well-preserved Miocene mammal fossils on display, which date from about 20 million years ago, and are among some of the best specimens of Miocene mammals.  The monument's museum collection also contains more than 500 items from the Cook Collection of Plains Indian artifacts, originally from the Agate Springs Ranch, a working cattle ranch, owned by Harold J. Cook.  The Cook Homestead (Bone Cabin Complex) is listed on the National Register of Historic Places.

Highways
  - east–west route through Harrison (Bridges to Buttes Byway)
  - route going south out of Harrison (Main Street)

Notable people

 Dwight Griswold, Governor of Nebraska from 1940 to 1946, and U.S. Senator from 1952 to 1954, was born in Harrison.

See also
 List of villages in Nebraska
 Sowbelly Canyon

References

External links

 Sioux County

Villages in Sioux County, Nebraska
Villages in Nebraska
County seats in Nebraska
Populated places established in 1886
1886 establishments in Nebraska